The Budos Band III is the third self-titled album by Staten Island, New York-based group The Budos Band. It was released on 2010 through Daptone Records. The New Yorker pop music critic Sasha Frere-Jones named it his favorite album of 2010.

Track listing

References 

2010 albums
Daptone Records albums